Stéphane Héaume (born 27 March 1971 in Paris) is a French novelist. He also writes texts for composers of classical music. After several years spent in Cameroun and New York, he now lives in Paris.

Novels 
 Le Clos Lothar, Paris, 2002 (Jury Prize of the Grand Prix Jean-Giono 2002 and Prix Emmanuel Roblès 2003) , and Seuil, series "Points", 2009.
 Orkhidos, Paris, Zulma, 2004 
 Le Fou de Printzberg, Paris, 2006  and Seuil, series "Points", 2007
 Le Contemplateur, Paris, Éditions Anne Carrière, 2007 
 La Nuit de Fort-Haggar, Paris, Seuil, 2009 
 Sheridan Square, Paris, Seuil, 2012 (Prix de la Ville de Deauville 2012) 
 L'Insolite évasion de Sebastian Wimer, Serge Safran, 2016

Short stories 
 L'Atlantide retrouvée in L'Atelier du roman (n°25), La Table Ronde, 2001 – Lueurs froides in Immédiatement (n°23), 2003 – Houldine in Houlgate, Aude et ses livres, 2003 – Le Livre de moire in Musique intime, Imprimerie Laffont, 2003 – Le Naturaliste in Décapage (n°34), La Table Ronde, 2008 – Par ordre du roi in Décapage (n°35), La Table Ronde, 2008 – Au Venusberg in Décapage (n°37), La Table Ronde, 2009 – La Flèche dans la Jungle in 100 Monuments, 100 Ecrivains, Editions du Patrimoine, 2010 – La Reine Alix in Les Cahiers Pierre Benoit, 2012 – Chemise blanche et bretelles noires in Couleurs Jazz (n°2), 2013 – Carlotta Palace in Les Deux Crânes, 2016.
 L'Idole noire, Éditions du Moteur, 2011

Essays 
 Emma, series "Les Prénoms", Paris, Zulma, 2001 
 Pierre Benoit, maître du roman d'aventures, Paris, Hermann, 2015

Lyrics and musical theatre 
 Le Voyage écarlate, music by Richard Dubugnon, Péniche Opéra, Paris, 2002 and Aix-en-Provence, 2005
 Cantata oscura, music by Richard Dubugnon, Espace Cardin, Paris, 2005 – Editions Peters.
 Valse désarticulée, music by Thierry Escaich, Paris, 2007
 Le Songe Salinas for mezzo-soprano and orchestra, music by Richard Dubugnon, created 14 May 2009 at Théâtre des Champs-Élysées in Paris by the Orchestre national de France, directed by Fabien Gabel, with mezzo-soprano Nora Gubisch – Editions Peters.
 Les Miroirs de la Ville for soprano, mezzo-soprano, tenor, barytone and piano, music by Thierry Escaich, 20e Concours International de Chant, Festival Symphonies d'Automne, 20 to 24 November 2013 – Éditions Gérard Billaudot.
 Mamamouchi, comédie-ballet after Le Bourgeois gentilhomme by Molière, music by J.-B. Lully, created 8 August 2014 at Festival du Périgord Noir by the Académie de musique ancienne, directed by Michel Laplénie. 
 La Reine, argument de ballet. Music by Joseph Haydn – Symphony. #85 en si bémol majeur, 2016.

Discography 
 Valse désarticulée, in Deux visages, Thierry Escaich. Caroline Meng, Jean-Pierre Baraglioli, Daphénéo, 2010.
 La Reine, Symphony # 85, Joseph Haydn. Rigel, Sarti, JC Bach. Julien Chauvin, Sandrine Piau, Concert de la Loge Olympique, Aparté / Harmonia Mundi, 23 September 2016. 
 Le Songe Salinas, Triptyque, Arcanes symphoniques, Richard Dubugnon. Nora Gubisch, Thomas Dolié – Orchestre national de France. Dir. Fabien Gabel, Laurent Petitgirard, Debora Waldman. Naxos # 8.573687, Decembre 2016.

External links 
 Stéphane Héaume's website
 Sheridan Square by Stéphane Héaume on Éditions du Seuil
 Stéphane Héaume on Zulma
 Stéphane Héaume on Forum Opera
 Stéphane Héaume – Interview on Luzycalor
 Lombez. Stéphane Héaume, écrivain en résidence on La Dépêche

21st-century French novelists
French opera librettists
Writers from Paris
1971 births
Living people
21st-century French short story writers
French male novelists
French male short story writers
Prix Emmanuel Roblès recipients
21st-century French male writers